The most southerly geographical features of various types are listed here.

Cities and settlements

Geography

Islands

Berkner Island is further south than any of these, but its bedrock lies entirely below sea level, with only its ice covering rising above.

Nature

Animals

Plants

Agriculture

Education

Science and technology

Historical sites and archaeological findings

Transportation

Recreation

Sport

Religious buildings

Shops and service facilities

International brand names

Franchised food brands

Gardens/parks, zoos and aquaria

Other

See also

List of northernmost items
Extreme points of Earth
Extreme points of the Antarctic
List of countries by southernmost point

References

Moore, D. M. (1983). Flora of Tierra del Fuego.

Physical geography
Geography of Antarctica
Lists of extreme points
Geography-related lists of superlatives